Ferling is the surname of the following people

Franz Wilhelm Ferling (born 1796), German musician
Bernadett Ferling (born 1977), Hungarian handball player
Holly Ferling (born 1995), Australian cricketer 
John E. Ferling (born 1940), American historian
 Lawrence Ferlinghetti (born Ferling in 1919), American poet, painter and liberal activist